Double Cross is a 1941 American Producers Releasing Corporation crime film directed by Albert H. Kelley and starring serial star Kane Richmond. The film is also known as Motorcycle Squad (American 16mm rental title).

Plot

When a nightclub that also features illegal gambling is raided by the police, uniformed motorcycle policeman Steve Bronson is in an adjoining room to the main area with his girlfriend, Fay Saunders, who is a co-owner of the club with Nick Taggart. When Fay sees several policemen scuffling with Nick she grabs Steve's revolver and shoots one of the policemen. The other policemen return fire mortally wounding Steve whilst Fay places the revolver next to him and declares she saw Steve fire on the police.

Steve's best friend is fellow motorcycle policeman Jim Murray, the son of a police captain who is the scourge of the city's criminals and corrupt politicians. Jim plans to infiltrate the night club to discover the truth on Steve's innocence with the help of his fiancée and Steve's sister Ellen. Jim begins to behave disgracefully that leads him to be drummed out of the police force. Fay, Nick and his criminal associates see Jim as an opportunity to gain information on police activities as well as to embarrass Jim's father Captain Murray who has already been the target of an unsuccessful assassination attempt. Fay begins to fall in love with Jim; Nick gathers some insurance for his future by clandestinely recording Fay's admitted it was she who shot the policeman in the raid.

When Nick catches Ellen taking a photograph of the mayor of the city accepting money from him he captures her and also catches on to Jim's true loyalties. He concocts a scheme to eliminate the both of them by blaming the zealous "shoot first, ask questions later" Captain Murray.

Cast 
Kane Richmond as Jim Murray
Pauline Moore as Ellen Bronson
Wynne Gibson as Fay Saunders
John Miljan as Nick Taggart
Richard Beach as Steve Bronson
Mary Gordon as Mrs. Murray
Robert Homans as Police Capt. Murray
William Halligan as Mayor
Frank Moran as Henchman Cookie
Heinie Conklin as Henchman Miggs
Daisy Ford as Nurse
Edward Keane as Police Commissioner Bob Trent
Walter Shumway as Sergeant Tucker
Ted Wray as Police Sgt. Rand
Jimmie Fox as Camera Shop owner
Charles F. Miller as John Frawley

External links 

1941 films
American black-and-white films
1941 crime drama films
Producers Releasing Corporation films
American crime drama films
1940s English-language films
1940s American films